Vârtop is a commune in Dolj County, Oltenia, Romania with a population of 1,850 people. It is composed of a single village, Vârtop.

References

Communes in Dolj County
Localities in Oltenia